Elijah Sogomo (born 9 March 1954) is a Kenyan sprinter. He competed in the men's 4 × 400 metres relay at the 1984 Summer Olympics.

References

1954 births
Living people
Athletes (track and field) at the 1984 Summer Olympics
Kenyan male sprinters
Olympic athletes of Kenya
Place of birth missing (living people)